Ramsey Glacier is a glacier about 45 nautical miles (80 km) long, originating in the Bush Mountains near the edge of the polar plateau and flowing north to the Ross Ice Shelf eastward of Den Hartog Peak. Discovered by the United States Antarctic Service (USAS) on Flight C of February 29-March 1, 1940, and named by Advisory Committee on Antarctic Names (US-ACAN), on the recommendation of R. Admiral Byrd, for Admiral DeWitt Clinton Ramsey, U.S. Navy, Vice Chief of Naval Operations during U.S. Navy Operation Highjump, 1946–47.

See also
Four Ramps

References

Glaciers of Dufek Coast